Ghabrana Nahi Hai (English: You shouldn't worry) is a 2022 Pakistani action comedy film directed by Saqib Khan, who also wrote it with Mohsin Ali. Produced by Jamil Baig under JB Films and Hassan Zia under Mastermind Production, it stars Saba Qamar and Zahid Ahmed. It was released on Eid al-Fitr, 3 May 2022, by Geo Films.

Premise
Being an only child to her father, Zubeda was raised more like a son to be an empowered woman. She wants justice for her father, and seeks help from officer Sikandar. However, she gets trapped in a love triangle with him and her cousin.

Cast

Lead
 Saba Qamar as Zubeda
 Zahid Ahmed as Sikandar, a cop

Recurring
 Nayyar Ejaz as Bhai Miyan (Antagonist)
 Syed Jibran as Vicky, Zubeda's cousin
 Afzal Khan as Aslam
 Saleem Meraj as Rizwan
 Gul-e-Rana as Gul-e-Rana
 Dodi Khan as Raza
 Shazeal Shoukat as Secretary
 Tayyab Mahmood Sheikh as Police Constable (Right)
 Sohail Ahmed as Chodhri Sajjad
Additionally, YouTuber Junaid Akram and news reporter Amin Hafeez also appear in the film.

Production
In September 2019, it was announced that Mohsin Khan and Saqib Khan would be making a film. Soon, Jamil Baig and Hassan Zia signed in as producers. The film was announced in January 2020 under the title Zubeda Mard Ban; however it was changed to Ghabrana Nahi Hai in February. As the cast was finalized, the filming was set to begin in March 2020; however, after only two days, it was paused due to the COVID-19 pandemic in Pakistan.

After the lockdown restrictions lifted, 90% principal photography took place in Malir District, Karachi, from November 2020 onward. Then filming took place respectively in Lahore and Faisalabad in January 2021, before wrap-up in February 2021; followed by post-production.

Arshad Khan served as cinematographer, and Hunain Shamim as editor; the cast and crew included 17 debutants, as the producers wanted to put forward fresh talent. The film's title is derived from the famous dialogue of Imran Khan, 22nd Prime Minister of Pakistan, though not in a sarcastic way but for a positive message.

Soundtrack

Release
The initial intention of the filmmakers was to release the film on Eid al-Adha in August 2020, however, it couldn't happen. The film teaser was released on 17 December 2021, and the film trailer on 12 March 2022. The film was released on Eid al-Fitr, 3 May 2022.

See also 

 Peechay Tou Dekho

 Quaid-e-Azam Zindabad

References

External links
 

2022 films
2022 romantic comedy films
2020s Urdu-language films
Films shot in Karachi
Films shot in Lahore
Geo Films films
Pakistani romantic comedy films
Pakistani action comedy films
Films postponed due to the COVID-19 pandemic
Films impacted by the COVID-19 pandemic
Urdu-language Pakistani films